César A. Hidalgo (born December 22, 1979) is a Chilean born, Chilean-Spanish-American physicist, author, and entrepreneur. He directs the Center for Collective Learning at the Artificial and Natural Intelligence Institute (ANITI) of the University of Toulouse. He is also an Honorary Professor at the University of Manchester, and is a visiting professor at Harvard's School of Engineering and Applied Sciences. Hidalgo is known for work on Economic Complexity, Relatedness, Data Visualization, Applied Artificial Intelligence, and Digital Democracy. Prior to joining the University of Toulouse, Hidalgo was a professor at MIT where he directed the Collective Learning group. He is also a founder and partner at Datawheel, a data visualization and distribution company. 

Hidalgo works broadly in the field of Collective Intelligence. His contributions to the field includes the introduction of methods to measure Economic Complexity and Relatedness, the study of people's perception of A.I., the study of Collective memory, and the development of multiple data visualization platforms, including DataUSA, DataViva, DataMexico, DataAfrica, and Pantheon, among others. He is the author of dozens of academic papers in complex systems, networks, and economic development, and has created applications of data science and artificial intelligence.

Hidalgo has authored or co-authored three books The Atlas of Economic Complexity, Why Information Grows, and How Humans Judge Machines.

His work has been honored in 2018 with the Lagrange Prize, in 2019 with the Centennial Medal from the University of Concepcion, and in 2011 with the Bicentennial Medial from the Chilean Congress. Awards for his data visualization and distribution platforms include three Webbys, one Information is Beautiful award, and one Indigo Design Award.

Early life and education

Hidalgo was born in Santiago de Chile in 1979 to Cesar E. Hidalgo and Nuria Ramaciotti. His father was a publicist and journalist and his mother a K-12 school administrator. He has two siblings Caterina and Nuria.

Hidalgo attended The Grange School until the age of fourteen. He completed his high school education at The British High School. From 1998 to 2003 he studied physics at Pontifical Catholic University of Chile. From 2004 to 2008 he obtained a PhD in physics from The University of Notre Dame with Albert-László Barabási as his PhD advisor. From 2008 to 2010 he was a postdoctoral research fellow at Harvard University.

Economic complexity

Starting in his PhD Hidalgo began using networks to study economic development. His main contributions include The Product Space, a network that can be used to predict a country's future patterns of diversification, and the economic complexity index, a formula that can be used to estimate the growth potential of economies. The economic complexity index is highly predictive of future economic growth and also is a strong explanatory factor of cross-national differences in income inequality. Hidalgo's work in Economic Complexity has been covered by important media outlets like The New York Times, The Economist, and The Financial Times.

Why Information Grows

In Why Information Grows Hidalgo explains economic growth as a consequence of the growth of information and computation in the universe. The book starts by explaining the physical mechanisms that allow information to grow, and then unpacks these mechanisms in the context of social and economic systems. The main argument of the book is that the need for computation to be embodied, in cells, humans, or teams of humans, is what makes the growth of information in the economy both possible and difficult.

Soon after its release the book was highly praised by economists including Paul Romer, who went on to win the Nobel prize for endogenous growth theory, Eric Beinhoecker, the director of Oxford's Institute for New Economic Thinking, and Tim Harford, a popular economics author and regular columnist for The Financial Times. Why Information Grows was also featured in The Economist'''s books and arts section of the July 25, 2015 print edition,  in Nature's May 28, 2015 print edition, and Kirkus Reviews, among others.

Data visualization and distribution platforms

Hidalgo has co-authored a number of popular data visualization and distribution platforms. These are tools that make available vast volumes of data through visualizations. These platforms include:

 The Observatory of Economic Complexity (OEC) 
The OEC is a tool that makes available international trade data through more than 20 million visualizations. The Observatory of Economic Complexity focuses on the mix of products that countries export because this product mix is predictive of a country's future patterns of diversification, G.D.P. growth, and income inequality. The OEC was co-authored with Alex Simões, who developed this platform as his master thesis in the Macro Connections group at the MIT Media Lab.

DataViva
DataViva is a visualization engine that makes available regional development data for all of Brazil through more than 1 billion visualizations. These visualizations include trade data, employment data and education data, for each of Brazil's more than 5000 municipalities and its hundreds of products, industries and occupations. DataViva was developed in a collaboration between Hidalgo, Alex Simões and Dave Landry, and the government of Minas Gerais in Brazil, including Minas's government department of strategic priorities and FAPEMIG, Minas Science funding agency.

 Pantheon 
Pantheon is a data visualization engine focused on historical cultural production and impact. Pantheon helps users explore metadata on globally famous biographies as a mean to understand the process of collective memory and of the role of languages and communication technologies in the production and diffusion of cultural information. Amy Yu, Kevin Hu, and Cesar Hidalgo developed pantheon at the Macro Connections group at MIT.

Immersion
Immersion is a data visualization engine for email metadata. Immersion helps uncover the networks people form while interacting through email. Immersion was co-authored by Hidalgo together with Daniel Smilkov and Deepak Jagsdish, while both Smilkov and Jagdish were working as students in Hidalgo's Macro Connection's group. Immersion was released in 2013, and quickly became popular as a way to demonstrate what people can learn by looking only at email metadata.

DataUSA

DataUSA is an effort to visualize and distribute public data for the United States. It was launched on April 4, 2016 and acclaimed by The New York Times, The Atlantic's City Lab, and Fast Company. DataUSA received the Information is Beautiful Award in 2016 and a Webby Award in 2017 for best Civil and Government Innovation. DataUSA was built by Datawheel in collaboration with Deloitte.

 DataAfrica 
DataAfrica makes available data on the health, poverty, agriculture, and climate, of thirteen African countries at the subnational level. DataAfrica won a 2018 webby award for best civil and government innovation.

 DataChile 
DataChile integrates and distributes data from more than a dozen Chilean government departments. It won a 2018 Indigo Design Award.

 DataMexico 
DataMexico is a systematized information platform with more than 13,000 profiles about regional economy, infrastructure, exterior commerce, employment, education, gender equity, inequality, health, and public security in Mexico. Includes a section about Economic Complexity to visualize development opportunities through dynamics between industries and products.

 Urban Perception 

Place Pulse, Streetscore, and Streetchange

Place Pulse, Streetscore, and Streetchange are tools created to map people's perceptions of urban environments. Place Pulse has been featured in The Guardian and Fast Company. Streetscore has been featured in The Economist and New Scientist'', among others.

Augmented Democracy 
In 2018, Hidalgo presented at TED's main event the idea of Augmented Democracy: a democracy in which people are represented directly by personalized digital twins powered by artificial intelligence. He is currently working on MonProgramme2022, a digital participation platform for the 2022 french presidential election.

Bibliography
A full list of books and publications can be found in Cesar Hidalgo's professional page

Books
’’How Humans Judge Machines’’ MIT Press (2021), 
‘’Why Information Grows: The Evolution of Order from Atoms to Economies’’ Basic Books, New York (2015) 
’’The Atlas of Economic Complexity’’ MIT Press (2014),

Selected articles

"Links that speak: The Global Language Network and its Association with Global Fame" Shahar Ronen, Bruno Goncalves, Kevin Hu, Alessandro Vespignani, Steven Pinker and César A. Hidalgo.  Proceedings of the National Academy of Sciences 10.1073/pnas.1410931111 (2014)
"The Collaborative Image of the City: Mapping the Inequality of Urban Perception" Philip Salesses, Katja Schechtner, and César A. Hidalgo.  PLoS ONE 8(7): e68400. DOI: 10.1371/journal.pone.0068400
"The Network Structure of Economic Output" R Hausmann, CA Hidalgo. Journal of Economic Growth (2011) 16:309–342 DOI 10.1007/s10997-011-9071-4
"The Building Blocks of Economic Complexity" CA Hidalgo, R Hausmann.  Proc. Natl. Acad. Sci. (2009) 106(26):10570-10575
"Understanding Individual Human Mobility Patterns" MC Gonzalez, CA Hidalgo, A-L Barabási. Nature (2008) 453: 779–782
"The Product Space Conditions the Development of Nations" CA Hidalgo, B Klinger, A-L Barabási, R Hausmann. Science (2007) 317: 482–487

References

Living people
Chilean scholars and academics
1979 births
People from Santiago
Pontifical Catholic University of Chile alumni
University of Notre Dame alumni
MIT Media Lab people
Massachusetts Institute of Technology faculty
Network scientists